Lago della Busalletta is an artificial lake in northwest Italy which straddles the provinces of Genoa (in Liguria) and Alessandria (in Piedmont), near the towns of Fraconalto and Busalla. At an elevation of 441, its surface area is 0.3 km².

References 

Busalletta
Busalletta
Busalletta
Metropolitan City of Genoa
Province of Alessandria